Caenorycta anholochrysa is a moth in the family Xyloryctidae. It was described by Alexey Diakonoff in 1966. It is found on Sulawesi.

References

Caenorycta
Moths described in 1966